Enclosed typographic characters may refer to:

Unicode blocks
 Enclosed Alphanumerics
 Enclosed Alphanumeric Supplement
 Enclosed CJK Letters and Months
 Enclosed Ideographic Supplement

Characters
 Enclosed A
 Enclosed C
 Enclosed R
 Enclosed T

See also
 Circle-k (disambiguation)
 Circle-c (disambiguation)
 Circled-a (disambiguation)